Damián Delgado is a Mexican film actor, who starred in The Other Conquest and co-starred in the John Sayles film, Men With Guns. He also acted in These Onions Don't Make Me Cry, A Corner of Paradise and Under a Spell. 

Born in Oaxaca, Mexico, Delgado has appeared frequently on television and in commercials. Delgado received a degree in Dramatic Literature and Theater from Mexico's Theater University Center, and he is also a dancer with extensive training in modern dance and classical ballet.

References

External links 

Delgado, Damian
Living people
Year of birth missing (living people)
Male actors from Oaxaca